Daniela Hunger (born 20 March 1972 in East Berlin) is a former medley and freestyle swimmer from East Germany, who won two golden medals at the 1988 Summer Olympics in Seoul, South Korea: in the women's 200 m individual medley, and as a member of the women's 4×100 m freestyle team. Hunger also competed at the 1992 Summer Olympics in Barcelona, Spain, where she captured three medals. She competed for SC Dynamo Berlin.

In 1998, several former East German swimmers have gone public with accusations against their coaches and physicians that they were systematically doped, Daniela Hunger being one of them.

References 

1972 births
Doping cases in swimming
German sportspeople in doping cases
Living people
German female swimmers
East German female swimmers
Olympic swimmers of Germany
Olympic swimmers of East Germany
East German female freestyle swimmers
East German female medley swimmers
Swimmers at the 1988 Summer Olympics
Swimmers at the 1992 Summer Olympics
Olympic gold medalists for East Germany
Olympic silver medalists for Germany
Olympic bronze medalists for East Germany
Olympic bronze medalists for Germany
Medalists at the 1988 Summer Olympics
Medalists at the 1992 Summer Olympics
Swimmers from Berlin
People from East Berlin
Olympic bronze medalists in swimming
World Aquatics Championships medalists in swimming
European Aquatics Championships medalists in swimming
Recipients of the Patriotic Order of Merit in gold
Recipients of the Silver Laurel Leaf
Olympic gold medalists in swimming
Olympic silver medalists in swimming